Rhopalomastix is a genus of ants in the subfamily Myrmicinae. It is restricted to the Oriental and Indo-Australian regions, where the ants nest under the bark of living trees.

Species
Rhopalomastix escherichi Forel, 1911
Rhopalomastix glabricephala Wang, Yong & Jaitrong, 2018
Rhopalomastix janeti Donisthorpe, 1936
Rhopalomastix mazu Terayama, 2009
Rhopalomastix murphyi Wang, Yong & Jaitrong, 2018
Rhopalomastix omotoensis Terayama, 1996
Rhopalomastix rothneyi Forel, 1900
Rhopalomastix striata Wang, Yong & Jaitrong, 2018
Rhopalomastix tenebra Wang, Yong & Jaitrong, 2018
Rhopalomastix umbracapita Xu, 1999

References

External links

Myrmicinae
Ant genera
Hymenoptera of Asia
Hymenoptera of Australia